Various English association football clubs located in East Anglia vie for being the Pride of Anglia, an unofficial title celebrated by fans of the clubs involved. These clubs include Cambridge United, Colchester United, Ipswich Town, Norwich City and Peterborough United—although  by modern geographical reckoning, Essex is not considered part of East Anglia. Currently, fans of Norwich can claim their club to be the Pride of Anglia under the two most common methods for deciding it, most recent league position and most recent result in the East Anglian derby.

Description

Professional association football teams from the ceremonial counties that make up East Anglia (i.e. the counties of Norfolk, Suffolk, Essex and Cambridgeshire in England) compete for this unofficial title (no actual official trophy or reward is awarded) which is celebrated by fans, pundits/media and the clubs themselves (among others) merely as regional prestige/bragging rights etc..

Winning the most recent East Anglian derby and/or finishing as the highest Anglian team in the league pyramid are the two main measures employed by fans/pundits etc. that decide who can claim this title.  The main two football clubs vying for the title are Ipswich Town from Suffolk and Norwich City from Norfolk. Both teams regularly compete in the top two tiers in the English football league in recent times and often find themselves in the same league, meaning at least two derby matches will be played during the season as league games, in addition to any cup/play-off games where the two teams may be drawn against each other. Potentially, the holder of the title using the derby game method can change many times during the season.

Other league clubs from the region include Colchester United, Peterborough United and Cambridge United. These teams occasionally find themselves in the same league as the aforementioned two protagonists and thus have the opportunity to claim the title for finishing highest in the league. This has only happened in 2007 to Colchester United, the club were (uniquely) awarded a special trophy by Anglia Television to mark the event.

East Anglian derby

When Norwich and Ipswich meet, the match is known as the 'East Anglian derby', first played in 1902. The most recent encounter played on 10 February 2019 ended in a 3–0 win for Norwich. As of February 2019, Norwich have not been beaten by Ipswich in a competitive derby match since April 2009. The fixture is sometimes referred to as the "Old Farm derby", a humorous reference to the "Glasgow Old Firm derby" and the stereotypical rural nature and farming tradition of East Anglia.

League position

Another commonly employed measure for "Pride of Anglia", and one that encompasses all of the East Anglian teams, is the side finishing as the highest-placed East Anglian team in the English football league system. In the 2021–22 season, Norwich finished bottom of the 2021–22 Premier League, making them the highest-ranked East Anglian team. Their nearest local competition was Peterborough United, who finished 7th in League One, with Ipswich finishing 11th. Norwich will also be highest finishers in the 2022–23 season by virtue of being the only East Anglian club in the second tier; second place will be contested by Peterborough, Cambridge and Ipswich in the English 3rd tier.

Current status
Norwich City will be the only East Anglian team in second tier making them the highest-ranked East Anglian team at least until the end of the 2022–23 season. There will be no East Anglian teams in the highest tier of English football for the 2022-23 season. Norwich are also the most recent derby match winners, winning the match played on 10 February 2019, 3–0. Currently there are no derby matches scheduled as Norwich and Ipswich play in different divisions and the only way the teams could meet is for a cup game. Peterborough, Cambridge and Ipswich will play in the 3rd tier of English football and compete for "2nd in Anglia".

See also
East Anglian derby

References

Association football terminology
Colchester United F.C.
Ipswich Town F.C.
Norwich City F.C.
England football derbies